Gymnopilus is a genus of gilled mushrooms within the fungal family Strophariaceae containing about 200 rusty-orange spored mushroom species formerly divided among Pholiota and the defunct genus Flammula.   The fruit body is typically reddish brown to rusty orange to yellow, medium to large, often with a well-developed veil.  Most members of Gymnopilus grow on wood but at times may appear terrestrial if the wood is buried or decomposed. Members of Pholiota and Cortinarius are easy to confuse with Gymnopilus. Pholiota can be distinguished by its viscid cap and duller (brown to cinnamon brown) spores, and Cortinarius grows on the ground. Beginners can confuse Gymnopilus with Galerina, which contains deadly poisonous species.

The genus Gymnopilus has over 200 species worldwide.

The name means naked pileus.

Psychoactive species
Fourteen members of Gymnopilus contain psilocybin, although their bitter taste often deters recreational users.  These species include G. aeruginosus, G. braendlei, G. cyanopalmicola, G. dilepis ,G. intermedius, G. junonius, G. luteofolius, G. luteoviridis, G. luteus, G. purpuratus, G. subearlei, G. subpurpuratus, G. validipes and G. viridans. Subspecies of G. junonius from Japan are reported to contain psilocybin, while some western North American members are inactive.

Several species of Gymnopilus contain bis-noryangonin [4-hydroxy-6-(4-hydrostyryl)-2-pyrone] and hispidine [4-hydroxy-6-(3,4-dihydroxystyryl)-2-pyrone], which are closely related to the alpha-pyrones found in kava.

Phylogenetics
A 2003 phylogenetics study identified five well-supported clades within Gymnopilus:
 the spectabilis-imperialis group
 nevadensis-penetrans group 
 a clade formed by G. underwoodii, G. validipes and G. cf. flavidellus
 aeruginosus-luteofolius group
 lepidotus-subearlei group

Although the genus Gymnopilus was found to be monophyletic, the phylogenetically related groups do not support the traditional infrageneric classifications based on morphology.

References

C.J. Alexopolous, Charles W. Mims, M. Blackwell  et al., Introductory Mycology, 4th ed. (John Wiley and Sons, Hoboken NJ, 2004)  
 Hesler, L. R. (1969). North American species of Gymnopilus. New York: Hafner. 117 pp.

 
Agaricales genera